Desmoloma is a genus of moths in the subfamily Lymantriinae. The genus was described by Felder in 1874.

Species
Desmoloma chironomus (Dyar, 1910) Colombia, French Guiana
Desmoloma erratica (Schaus, 1906) Venezuela
Desmoloma modesta (Dognin, 1923) Brazil (Amazonas)
Desmoloma mollis (Dyar, 1910) French Guiana
Desmoloma styracis Felder, 1874 Venezuela, French Guiana

References

Lymantriinae